The American Adventure was a theme park in Derbyshire, England, quite close to both Nottingham and Derby on the edge of Ilkeston. The park for many years had a number of large white-knuckle attractions, but in 2005 was re-themed as a 'family' park aimed at the under-14 market. In January 2007, the owners announced that it would not reopen for the new season, and the rides would be sold off.

History
The American Adventure, built on an area of Country Park which had been subject to deep seam and opencast coal mining, was originally opened in June 1987 with an Old West and Cowboys vs. Native Americans theme. A theme park called Britannia Park had been opened on the site in 1985 but closed after just 10 weeks, insolvent, and its founder Peter Kellard was later imprisoned for fraud. Derbyshire County Council purchased the site in 1986 and sold it to the conglomerate Granada, which in June 1987 opened the American Adventure, heralded as Britain's Major New Theme Park.

Initial attractions at the American Adventure included the two-drop log flume Cherokee Falls, the runaway mine train, the Buffalo Stampede roller coaster, a pirate ship, and a Ferris wheel.

In 1989, the original theme expanded to other elements of North American culture and history. This involved an area themed around space travel, featuring the Missile roller coaster, a Vekoma Boomerang coaster which was at the time voted the best roller coaster in the UK. Shortly before this there was the Canadian themed addition of the Rocky Mountain Rapids. In the same year, the Assault Course round in the junior version of The Krypton Factor (known as Young Krypton) was filmed. In 1993, the log-flume was extended to have a third drop and was renamed from Cherokee Falls to Nightmare Niagara. The extra drop made it the tallest log flume in the UK throughout its operational life (this record was reverted to Loggers Leap at Thorpe Park as this ride used to hold the record before the new drop was added, and when that closed in 2015, the title went to Tiger Rock at Chessington World of Adventures). In 1995, the Iron Wolf roller coaster (now located in a Polish theme park and known as the Tic Tac Tornado) was installed, which broke away from the American theming of the park and was instead themed around the ITV gameshow Gladiators.

From 1996 onwards, the park began to decline, and in 1997, Granada sold it to the company Ventureworld which was headed by John Broome, a former Alton Towers developer. During the reign of Broome as owner of the park, the only noticeable change was the addition of minor or upcharge attractions, and the slow decline of many of the park's attractions.

Ventureworld immediately renamed the park American Adventure World, with the intention of dropping the American theming and ultimately renaming the park Adventure World. Various logos produced over the next few seasons would use the "American Adventure World" name, but with the prominence of the first and last words varying wildly. By the end of the park's life, the title had reverted to The American Adventure.

In 1999, Broome announced his departure. The THG Group, which also owned Pontins and Blackpool Tower, bought the park. After 1999, many of the smaller rides were removed from the park, and it slowly fell into decline. The old main entrance to the park had to be closed due to subsidence, and the new entrance was much less attractive.

2005 saw the closing down of three major rides for which the park was famous, including Nightmare Niagara and The Missile. At the time, it was also believed that the Rocky Mountain Rapids was also ending its life. The two water rides were supposedly closed due to structural instability and water pollution problems, whilst the Missile was not deemed to fit in with the parks new 'family' label and had also experienced heavy disrepair. Missile was relocated to Pleasurewood Hills as 'Wipeout'. At the start of the season, the pirate ship ride called the Yankee Clipper was closed with the intention of it being reopened later in the season. However, due to refurbishment taking longer than planned it did not open until the following season.

2006 was the final year the theme park operated. There were some signs of investment and heavy emphasis on the new 'family' image. New rides included the Mini Mine Rush, a kids roller coaster, now relocated at Flamingo Land, a new motorbike attraction in the building previously used for the log flume station, as well as the re-opening of the newly refurbished Rocky Mountain Rapids and Yankee Clipper rides.

Notable rides

Closure

After 19 years of operating, American Adventure announced on 4 January 2007 that the park would not be reopening for the 2007 season.

Derbyshire County Council reviewed options for the site's future, stating that they will only allow minimal development on the site. Part of the park has been leased, while the rest is being controlled by Derbyshire County Council. The park has been given the name "Shipley Lakeside" and the land was listed for sale on the Derbyshire County Council land. The park has since been demolished to make way for development. In 2008, three potential buyers expressed an interest in purchasing the land. In July 2012, it was announced that a project to redevelop the land into "housing, offices and leisure facilities" had been given the green light.

The popularity of the theme park was such that in 2017 thousands signed a petition to reopen it. In 2020 OnTrack Productions began selling park pin padges and set up a Facebook page for the park. Due to the success of this a 6 part documentary is being made by OnTrack Production's.

References

External links
American Adventure ride now being used thousands of miles away

The American Adventure Fansite, theamericanadventure.info
Article by William Squires documenting the park's history, s104638357.websitehome.co.uk
Article on Britannia Park Including Pictures of Original Promotional leaflets, heanorhistory.org.uk
A photostream on Flickr detailing a 2005 visit to the now-closed park, flickr.com

1987 establishments in England
2007 disestablishments in England
Amusement parks closed in 2007
Amusement parks opened in 1987
Amusement parks in England
Defunct amusement parks in England
Defunct amusement parks in the United Kingdom
Tourist attractions in Derbyshire
Western (genre) theme parks